Keith Mason (born 19 April 1951) was, until 1 November 2011, the Chief Executive of the Science and Technology Facilities Council (STFC) of the United Kingdom. He assumed the post on 1 April 2007 after the merger of the Council for the Central Laboratory of the Research Councils (CCLRC) and the Particle Physics and Astronomy Research Council (PPARC), having previously been chief executive of PPARC.

Early life
He attended Ysgol John Bright, the John Bright Grammar School. After a farming childhood on the Llyn Peninsula, Mason initially trained as an astronomer, studying for a BSc and PhD in Physics at University College London, and was a candidate astronaut.

Career
He subsequently worked on X-ray astronomy at UC Berkeley before returning to the UCL Mullard Space Science Laboratory, eventually becoming a professor at UCL and director of the Mullard Laboratory in 2003.

References

 

1951 births
Living people
20th-century British astronomers
People educated at Ysgol John Bright
People from Gwynedd
Science and Technology Facilities Council
Academics of UCL Mullard Space Science Laboratory
21st-century British astronomers